Koo Cha-kyung (24 April 1925 – 14 December 2019) was a South Korean business executive. He was the chairman of LG Group from 1970 until his retirement in 1995. He took the company public in 1970 and was chairman during the company's growth from 26 billion won to 30 trillion won.

Life
Koo was born 24 April 1925 in Jinju, Korea to Koo In-Hwoi, who went on to found GoldStar and Lak Hui Chemical Industrial Corp, a plastics manufacturer and, later, a producer of toiletries.

Koo began his career at Lak Hui where he managed production lines for 20 years. The elder Koo died on 31 December 1969 and left the company to his son as chairman. He took the company public in 1970, the first privately held firm to go public.

During his tenure, the company's revenue increased significantly as it expanded globally across Asia, Europe and North America. In 1995, Koo Cha-kyung retired from the company and turned it over to his son, Koo Bon-moo.

Koo Cha-kyung died on 14 December 2019 at the age of 94.

References

1925 births
2019 deaths
People from Jinju
South Korean businesspeople
FC Seoul directors and chairmen